Delessert is a surname. Notable people with the surname include:

 Adolphe Delessert (1809–1869), French explorer and naturalist
 Édouard Delessert (1828–1898), French painter, archaeologist and photographer
 Étienne Delessert (banker) (1735–1816), French banker
 Étienne Delessert (illustrator) (born 1941), Swiss graphic artist and illustrator
 François-Marie Delessert (1780–1868), French banker and politician
 Jules Paul Benjamin Delessert (1773–1847), French banker and naturalist